Mink, Rat or Rabbit is the first album by The Detroit Cobras, released 24 February 1998 (see 1998 in music).

The title quotes a line from Irma Thomas's "Hittin on Nothing" complaining that the singer has not received a promised mink coat.

Track listing

Cha Cha Twist
Original by Brice Coefield
I'll Keep Holding On
Original by The Marvelettes
Putty (In Your Hands)
Original by The Shirelles
Easier To Cry
Original by The Shangri-Las
Bad Girl
Original by The Oblivians
Summer (The Slum)
Original by The 5 Royales
Midnight Blues
Original by Charlie Rich
You Knows What To Do
Original by Barrett Strong
Can't Do Without You
Original by Dusty Wilson
Hittin' On Nothing
Original by Irma Thomas
Out Of This World
Original by Gino Washington
Chumbawa
Original by Gabriel And The Angels
Breakaway
Original by Irma Thomas

Personnel
Rachel Nagy	 - 	Vocals
Maribel (Mary) Ramirez	 - 	Guitar/Vocals
Steve Shaw	 - 	Guitar/Vocals
Jeff Meier	 - 	Bass
Damian Lang	 - 	Drums/Vocals

References

1998 debut albums
The Detroit Cobras albums
Sympathy for the Record Industry albums
Covers albums